Constantine Kabasilas was a prominent Byzantine cleric in the mid-13th century. Before 1235 he had served as archbishop of Strumitza and then as metropolitan bishop of Dyrrhachium, and sometime before the mid-1250s he was appointed to the prestigious post of Archbishop of Ohrid.

Born to the noble Kabasilas family, attested since the early 11th century, he was the brother of John Kabasilas, a minister at the court of the Despot of Epirus, Michael II Komnenos Doukas, and of Theodore Kabasilas, another of Michael II's supporters. Due to his brothers' close ties to the Epirote ruler, his loyalty was suspected by the Nicaean emperor Theodore II Laskaris, and he was put in prison until 1259, when Michael VIII Palaiologos set him free and allowed him to return to his see.

References

Sources 

 
 

13th-century Byzantine bishops
Constantine 02
Constantine
Byzantine prisoners and detainees
People of the Despotate of Epirus
People of the Empire of Nicaea
13th-century Albanian people